White Noise is a 2019 play by Suzan-Lori Parks. It premiered at The Public Theater in New York.

Characters
The central characters are two woke interracial couples, good friends since college.
Leo, a black artist and insomniac. He has tried a white noise machine to help him sleep, and describes himself as "the fractured and angry and edgy black visual artist."
Dawn, a white liberal lawyer. Something of a "white saviour".
Ralph, a white and wealthy writer.
Misha, the black host of the YouTube show Ask a Black.

Plot
Leo, out walking one night, is assaulted by police. To regain a sense a safety, he asks his friend Ralph to buy him as a slave for forty days, positing that he will be safer as a white man's property. Ralph, initially terrified of being white, male and straight, agrees. Their new relationship corrupts Ralph and releases his inner "whitey", and he joins a club exclusively for whites. In the second act, Ralph makes Leo wear a slave collar.

Productions

The 2019 debut at The Public Theater in New York was directed by Oskar Eustis, and included Daveed Diggs as Leo, Zoe Winters as Dawn, Thomas Sadoski as Ralph and Sheria Irving as Misha.

A 2021 London production at the Bridge Theatre was directed by Polly Findlay, and included Ken Nwosu as Leo, Helena Wilson as Dawn, James Corrigan as Ralph and Faith Omole as Misha.

One change between the New York and London productions is that while in the 2019 production the characters hang out in a bowling alley, their hang out is a shooting range in 2021. 2021 reviewers have noted that the play brings to mind the 2020 murder of George Floyd, though it premiered the year before.

An early 2022 production at the Studio Theatre, Washington, D.C. was directed by Reginald L. Douglas. It included RJ Brown as Leo, Katie Kleiger as Dawn, Quinn Franzen as Ralph and Tatiana Williams as Misha. There were significant changes made from the 2019 production, more than 20 minutes were cut.

Reception

2019
Theater critic Ben Brantley said "Though White Noise runs a full three hours, and skids on some of its plot twists, it doesn’t feel long. By its end, you may marvel at how many forms, faces and exploitative uses of racial identity it has covered. ... In burrowing deep into what one character calls “the worm hole” of how we talk — and think — about race, Ms. Parks isn’t cutting anyone any slack. Herself included." The Guardian'''s reviewer gave the play four out of five stars, saying it "finds [Parks] at her most realistic, which is fun in some ways and frustrating in others. It’s a pleasure to hear her vital, playful intelligence shoved into the mouths of contemporary, recognizable characters and then exasperating when those characters behave implausibly."

Theater critic Hilton Als, in a mostly negative review, found the play lacking compared to some of Parks' earlier work.

2021The Independent and The Daily Telegraph gave the play four out of five stars. The Independent said that while the scenario is massively implausible, the play "is undercut with a fatalism about a culturally required wokeness that only goes surface-deep, that’s rapidly shrugged off like a heavy coat when things get too heated. It’s grim, brilliantly perceptive, and lets no one off the hook." According to The Daily Telegraph, "its ambitious scope of ideas ensures that the play is funny, challenging, audacious and profoundly unsettling. Three hours seldom passed so quickly."The Guardian, the newspaper i and the Evening Standard gave the play three out of five stars, one reviewer saying that "even when neither the story nor the characters are believable, this is still a propulsive drama with pace, plotting and a deadly magnetism, and its greatest triumph lies in the virtuosity and vigour of its astonishing cast."The Times'' gave the play two out of five stars. The reviewer said that while the play is extremely well acted, "Parks demands three hours of your time, and in return offers a rambling piece constructed around a ludicrous premise."

Awards
 2019 Obie Award, playwriting.
 2019 Outer Critics Circle Award, outstanding new off-Broadway play.

References

External links
 White Noise at Bridge Theatre
 Playwright Suzan-Lori Parks Handles Heavy Themes In Racial Drama White Noise, 2019 NPR interview
 Daveed Diggs, Thomas Sadoski & Suzan-Lori Parks Discuss The Public's Play, White Noise, video from 2019
 White Noise | Interview with White Noise Movement Director Jade Hackett, video from 2021
 Rousuck's Review: Suzan-Lori Parks' "White Noise" at Studio Theatre (DC), 2022 review at WYPR

Plays by Suzan-Lori Parks
Off-Broadway plays
Obie Award-winning plays
Plays about race and ethnicity
Fiction about interracial romance